Hajos could be:
The Hajos–Parrish–Eder–Sauer–Wiechert reaction in organic chemistry
Zoltan Hajos (1926–2022), Hungarian-American organic chemist
Hajós, a town in Bács-Kiskun county, Hungary